Douglas High School may refer to:

Canada
Mount Douglas Secondary School, Cadboro Bay, British Columbia

United States
Douglas High School (Alabama)
Douglas High School (Arizona)
Douglas High School (Minden, Nevada)
Douglas High School (Winston, Oregon)
Douglas High School (Box Elder, South Dakota), Box Elder, South Dakota
Douglas High School (West Virginia), Huntington, West Virginia
Douglas High School (Wyoming)
Marjory Stoneman Douglas High School, Parkland, Florida
Stoneman Douglas High School shooting occurred on February 14, 2018
David Douglas High School, Portland, Oregon
Covington-Douglas High School, Covington, Oklahoma
Douglas Anderson School of the Arts, Jacksonville, Florida
Douglas Byrd High School, Fayetteville, North Carolina
Douglas County High School (Colorado), Castle Rock, Colorado
Douglas County High School (Douglasville, Georgia)  — Douglasville, Georgia
Douglas East Campus School, Douglas, Arizona
Gen. Douglas Macarthur High School, Levittown, New York
Juneau-Douglas High School, Juneau, Alaska
Kirk Douglas Continuation School, Northridge, California
North Douglas High School, Drain, Oregon
Stephen A. Douglas High School, Philadelphia, Pennsylvania

See also
Douglass High School (disambiguation)